The Reynolds School District is a school district in the U.S. state of Oregon and serves the cities of Fairview, Wood Village and Troutdale, as well as parts of Portland and Gresham, with an enrollment of 10,411 students.

History
Reynolds School District is named for what was once the region's biggest employer, Reynolds Aluminum. The district was formed when the Fairview, Troutdale, and Wilkes elementary school districts merged in 1954.

In 2015, a bond resolution was proposed, that would grant the district $125,000,000. The district would utilize this money to replace and renovate several schools within the district, as well install security upgrades in every school. The four major projects are replacing Troutdale Elementary, Fairview Elementary, and Wilkes Elementary with new buildings, and remodeling a large portion of Reynolds High School. The bond was passed with 52% voting in favor. Construction on the first secure vestibules started in late 2016, and major projects began on spring of 2017. These projects are projected to be completed on fall of 2018.

Board 
The Reynolds school board comprises seven elected members who serve for four years.

Demographics
The district had 768 students who were homeless sometime during the 2012-2013 school year according to the Department of Education, or 6.76% of students in the district.

Schools
Elementary schools
 Alder
 Davis
 Fairview
 Glenfair
 Hartley
 Margaret Scott
 Salish Ponds
 Sweetbriar
 Troutdale
 Wilkes
 Woodland

Middle schools
 H.B. Lee
 Reynolds Middle School
 Walt Morey
Located in Troutdale, Walt Morey was named after Walt Morey who wrote books about the Pacific Northwest. 

High schools
 Reynolds High School
 Reynolds Learning Academy
 Community Transition Program

Alternative schools
 Four Corners

Charter schools
ACE Academy
KNOVA Learning
Multisensory Learning Academy Elementary School
Multisensory Learning Academy Middle School
Reynolds Arthur Academy

See also 
 List of school districts in Oregon

References

External links 
 Reynolds School District (official website)

School districts in Oregon
Education in Multnomah County, Oregon
Education in Gresham, Oregon
Education in Portland, Oregon
1954 establishments in Oregon
School districts established in 1954